Ilovaisk is a city in Khartsyzk municipality, Donetsk Oblast, Ukraine. The city is de facto under the military occupation of Russia and administered by the Donetsk People's Republic.

The city is known as a major regional railroad hub. It was also the site of a battle in the conflict of 2014.

Battle of Ilovaisk 

Starting in mid-April 2014, Russian paramilitaries captured several towns in Donetsk Oblast, including Ilovaisk. On 19 August 2014, Ukrainian forces reportedly secured the city centre from the Russia-backed militants; fighting for control of other parts of the town continued. The next morning they claimed they had control over one half of the town with the town divided by a railroad line. On 21 August, heavy fighting for control of the town (according to the Ukrainian Armed Forces "in some districts of Ilovaisk", while the Russia-backed forces claimed they had repelled the Ukrainian military and had surrounded a contingent of Ukrainian troops) continued. Fighting for control of the town continued over the next days. The Russian Armed Forces retook the city as of 1 September 2014.

Demographics
Native language as of the Ukrainian Census of 2001:
Russian  82.6%
Ukrainian  16.8%
Armenian  0.2%
Romani  0.1%

References

External links

Cities in Donetsk Oblast
Cities of district significance in Ukraine
Populated places established in the Russian Empire
Donetsk Raion